Paul Popp (born 2 February 1963) is an Austrian former cyclist. He competed in three events at the 1984 Summer Olympics. He won the Austrian National Road Race Championships in 1986.

References

External links
 

1963 births
Living people
Austrian male cyclists
Olympic cyclists of Austria
Cyclists at the 1984 Summer Olympics
Cyclists from Vienna
20th-century Austrian people